Miguel Araico Álvarez  (born 22 September 1914, date of death unknown) was a Mexican boxer. He competed in the men's featherweight event at the 1932 Summer Olympics.

References

External links
 
 

1914 births
Year of death missing
Mexican male boxers
Olympic boxers of Mexico
Boxers at the 1932 Summer Olympics
Boxers from Mexico City
Featherweight boxers